The Howard Park Historic District  is a national historic district located at South Bend, St. Joseph County, Indiana.  It encompasses 27.6-acres and includes 51 contributing buildings, 2 additional contributing structures, and 1 further contributing site (Howard Park, named after state supreme justice Timothy Edward Howard). It developed between about 1880 and 1947, and includes notable examples of Queen Anne, Colonial Revival, Renaissance Revival, Prairie School, and Bungalow / American Craftsman style architecture and works by architects Austin & Shambleau. Notable buildings include the Sunnyside Apartments (1922), Studebaker / Johnson House (1907), Zion Evangelical Church (1888, 1930), the Works Progress Administration built Howard Park Administrative Building (1940), and Lister / Plotkin House (1882).

It was listed on the National Register of Historic Places in 1999.

References

Parks in Indiana
Works Progress Administration in Indiana
Historic districts on the National Register of Historic Places in Indiana
Renaissance Revival architecture in Indiana
Queen Anne architecture in Indiana
Colonial Revival architecture in Indiana
Geography of St. Joseph County, Indiana
Historic districts in South Bend, Indiana
National Register of Historic Places in St. Joseph County, Indiana
Parks on the National Register of Historic Places in Indiana